The 2010–11 Cypriot Fourth Division was the 26th season of the Cypriot fourth-level football league. Ormideia FC won their 1st title.

Format
Fourteen teams participated in the 2010–11 Cypriot Fourth Division. All teams played against each other twice, once at their home and once away. The team with the most points at the end of the season were crowned champions. The first three teams were promoted to the 2011–12 Cypriot Third Division and the last three teams were relegated to regional leagues.

Point system
Teams received three points for a win, one point for a draw and zero points for a loss.

Changes from previous season
Teams promoted to 2010–11 Cypriot Third Division
 Enosis Neon Parekklisia
 Nikos & Sokratis Erimis
 Anagennisi Germasogeias

Teams relegated from 2009–10 Cypriot Third Division
 THOI Lakatamia
 Kissos Kissonergas
 Achyronas Liopetriou

Teams promoted from regional leagues
 POL/AE Maroni
 Dynamo Pervolion
 Finikas Ayias Marinas Chrysochous

Teams relegated to regional leagues
 Orfeas Nicosia
 Ellinismos Akakiou
 Olympos Xylofagou
 AEK Kythreas

Stadia and locations

League standings

Results

See also
 Cypriot Fourth Division
 2010–11 Cypriot First Division
 2010–11 Cypriot Cup for lower divisions
 Cypriot football league system

References

Sources
 

Cypriot Fourth Division seasons
Cyprus
2010–11 in Cypriot football